Spencer Ball Akin (13 February 1889 – 6 October 1973) was a retired United States Army major general. During World War II, he served as the Chief Signal Officer, United States Army Forces in the Far East under General Douglas MacArthur. Akin later served as Chief Signal Officer, United States Army from 1947 to 1951.

Early life and education
Akin was born and raised in Greenville, Mississippi. He attended the Virginia Military Institute, graduating in 1910. Akin later graduated from the Infantry School advanced course in 1926, the Command and General Staff School in 1928, and the Army War College in 1936. He returned to the Virginia Military Institute to complete a B.S. degree in civil engineering in 1933.

Military career
Akin was commissioned as a second lieutenant of infantry in September 1910. Promoted to first lieutenant in July 1916 and captain in May 1917, he served as a temporary major from February 1918 to May 1920 during World War I.

In July 1920, Akin was permanently promoted to major and transferred to the Army Signal Corps. He was promoted to lieutenant colonel in August 1935 and colonel in August 1939.

Sent to the Philippines in 1941, Akin became chief signal officer under General MacArthur. He received a temporary promotion to brigadier general in December 1941. He was awarded the Distinguished Service Cross for his actions during the Japanese invasion of the Philippines. He escaped with MacArthur from Corregidor to Australia in March 1942. There he became Chief Signal Officer, GHQ, Allied Forces in the Southwest Pacific Area and helped to establish Central Bureau to coordinate Allied signals intelligence. Akin also equipped a flotilla of small vessels like Argosy Lemal as radio relay stations.

Akin declined to remain behind a desk in Australia, earning one Silver Star during the December 1942 invasion of New Guinea and a second one in 1944. He received a temporary promotion to major general in November 1943. Akin was made an honorary commander of the Order of the British Empire in 1945.

After the war, Akin was reduced in rank to brigadier general in May 1946. On 1 April 1947, he became the Army's chief signal officer and received a permanent promotion to major general. Akin retired from active duty on 31 March 1951.

Personal
Akin was the son of Seddon Pleasants Akin and Martha Giles (Chaffin) Akin.

Akin married Eleanor Holt Stone (30 September 1890 – 10 October 1959) on 15 June 1915. They had two daughters.

Akin and his wife settled in Purcellville, Virginia after his retirement. He died at Loudoun County Memorial Hospital in Leesburg. Akin and his wife are buried at Arlington National Cemetery.

References

1889 births
1973 deaths
People from Greenville, Mississippi
Virginia Military Institute alumni
Military personnel from Mississippi
United States Army personnel of World War I
United States Army Command and General Staff College alumni
United States Army War College alumni
United States Army generals of World War II
Recipients of the Air Medal
Recipients of the Silver Star
Recipients of the Distinguished Service Cross (United States)
Recipients of the Legion of Merit
Recipients of the Distinguished Service Medal (US Army)
Honorary Commanders of the Order of the British Empire
United States Army generals
United States Army personnel of the Korean War
People from Purcellville, Virginia
Burials at Arlington National Cemetery